Nickelodeon Kart Racers 2: Grand Prix is a racing video game developed by Bamtang Games and published by GameMill Entertainment in North America, Maximum Games in Europe, and Ripples Asia Venture in Japan. A sequel to 2018's Nickelodeon Kart Racers, it was released for Nintendo Switch, PlayStation 4, and Xbox One on October 6, 2020, and for Windows on December 1, 2020. Mobile versions for Android and iOS were later released on February 24, 2022. A sequel, titled Nickelodeon Kart Racers 3: Slime Speedway, was released in October 2022.

Gameplay 
Nickelodeon Kart Racers 2: Grand Prix features a selection of 30 playable racers, consisting of characters from 12 different Nicktoons and real-life actress JoJo Siwa. Each character has different gameplay statistics such as top speed and handling, which can be further altered by customizing their kart with different unlockable vehicle parts. There are also 70 non-playable "pit crew" characters based on these shows, made up of 20 "chiefs" and 50 "crew", with players able to equip one chief and two crew before each race. Chief characters will give the player an additional ability they can activate at any time during the race, such as a sudden speed boost or temporary shield; each use requires players to first fill a slime meter by driving through slime or collecting slime tokens on the track. Crew characters grant abilities that are automatically activated under specific circumstances, such as giving the player a speed boost after they are struck by an item or obstacle, or collecting only a specific item from item containers; once used, these abilities have a cooldown period and cannot be activated again until a certain amount of time has passed. 

The game includes 28 race tracks based on different locations from the represented shows, including four remastered from its predecessor, and two battle arenas based on Double Dare and the Kids' Choice Awards. Each track features slime sources to recharge chief abilities, speed boosters to gain an extra burst of speed, containers with items that can be used to hinder opponents, and shortcuts which often require more skilled play to access. Players can also trigger additional speed boosts during the race by continuously drifting around turns or performing tricks when launching off jumps. Players can choose between four speed classes for races, ranging from "slow" to "insane". The game features a single-player grand prix mode, which challenges players to complete sequences of four races with the highest overall rank; a time trial mode for players to complete a lap on each track in the shortest time possible; and a challenge mode consisting of 42 preset scenarios which the player must complete. Players can unlock new characters, pit crew and vehicle parts by winning every grand prix in each speed class and completing every challenge. Additional vehicle parts can be purchased from the in-game garage by spending slime tokens obtained through races; a total of 80 vehicle parts can be unlocked. The game also supports local multiplayer for up to four players, as well as online multiplayer for up to eight players, a feature that was not in its predecessor.

Playable characters

Development 
Nickelodeon Kart Racers 2: Grand Prix was leaked by Target on June 10, 2020, and was announced on June 11, 2020. A trailer for the game was released the same day as its announcement. A simplified mobile version developed by Kung Fu Factory was released on February 24, 2022 under the name Nickelodeon Kart Racers. Unlike the console versions, it incorporates free-to-play elements and utilizes motion and touch controls.

Reception 

Nickelodeon Kart Racers 2: Grand Prix received "mixed or average" reviews according to review aggregator Metacritic, though scores were consistently higher than those of its predecessor. Nintendo Life called it "everything the original game should have been" and stated that it "will appeal far more to Nickelodeon fans new and old." However, they criticized the lack of voice acting.

Notes

References

External links 
Official website

2020 video games
PlayStation 4 games
PlayStation 4 Pro enhanced games
Xbox One games
Xbox One X enhanced games
Nintendo Switch games
Windows games
IOS games
Android (operating system) games
GameMill Entertainment games
Video games developed in Peru
Video games based on animated television series
SpongeBob SquarePants video games
Video games based on Hey Arnold!
Video games based on Teenage Mutant Ninja Turtles
Rugrats and All Grown Up! video games
Avatar: The Last Airbender games
The Ren & Stimpy Show video games
Rocko's Modern Life video games
Invader Zim video games
Danny Phantom video games
Nicktoon racing games
Nicktoons video games
Racing video games
Kart racing video games
Crossover racing games
Multiplayer and single-player video games
Split-screen multiplayer games
Video game sequels
Kung Fu Factory games
Maximum Games games